"Be My Baby Tonight" is a song written by Richard Fagan and Ed Hill, and recorded by American country music artist John Michael Montgomery.  It was released in May 1994 as the third single from Montgomery's album Kickin' It Up. It reached number one on the United States and Canada country charts in August 1994.

Critical reception
Deborah Evans Price, of Billboard magazine reviewed the song, saying that while Montgomery, "handles this one with ease", she considers it just "a notch above ordinary."

Music video
The music video was directed by Marc Ball, and premiered in mid-1994. The video takes place at Davis–Monthan Air Force Base.

Chart performance
"Be My Baby Tonight" debuted at number 71 on the U.S. Billboard Hot Country Singles & Tracks for the week of May 7, 1994.

Year-end charts

References

1994 singles
1994 songs
John Michael Montgomery songs
Songs written by Richard Fagan
Songs written by Ed Hill
Song recordings produced by Scott Hendricks
Atlantic Records singles